The 2018–19 FA Women's National League Cup is the 28th running of the competition, which began in 1991. It is the first since a restructure and rebranding of the top four tiers of English football by The Football Association. It is the major League Cup competition run by the FA Women's National League, and for the fifth season it is being run alongside their secondary League Cup competition, the National League Plate.

All 72 National League clubs entered at the Determining round, with the winners continuing in the competition and the losers going into the National League Plate tournament. Blackburn Rovers is the reigning champions, having defeated Leicester City  3–1 the previous season.

Results
All results listed are published by The Football Association. Games are listed by round in chronological order, and then in alphabetical order of the home team where matches were played simultaneously.

The division each team play in is indicated in brackets after their name: (S)=Southern Division; (N)=Northern Division; (SW1)=Division One South West; (SE1)=Division One South East; (M1)=Division One Midlands; (N1)=Division One North.

Qualifying rounds

Determining round
The competition begins with a Determining Round, which consisted of all 72 teams in the FA Women's National League being drawn in pairs. The winners of these 36 games progress to the next stage of the competition, while the losers qualify for the 2018–19 FA Women's National League Plate.

Competition proper

First round
With 36 teams progressing from the determining round, four needed to be eliminated to allow a single-elimination knockout tournament to take place. Twenty eight of the winners from the determining round were given byes to the second round, with eight teams being drawn against each other in first round ties.

Second round

Third round

Quarter-finals

Semi-finals

Final

References

FA Women's National League Cup
Prem